= Checkmath =

1968 board game

Checkmath is a board game published in 1968 by Grant Trading.

== Contents ==
Checkmath is a game in which numbered counters are placed on opposite sides of a ten-by-ten squared board also marked with numbers, and players take each other's pieces by landing on spaces occupied by their pieces.

== Reception ==
Eric Solomon reviewed Checkmath for Games International magazine, and gave it 2 stars out of 5, and stated that "Checkmath is one of those games which an educationalist might applaud, but it bored me stiff. I will concede that it might be a good idea to play it several times with a six year old child, but after the age of seven it should be used only as punishment."
